Raz Cohen is an Israeli footballer currently playing with Hapoel Ramat Gan.

External links

1994 births
Israeli Jews
Living people
Israeli footballers
Hapoel Kfar Saba F.C. players
Hapoel Tel Aviv F.C. players
Hapoel Umm al-Fahm F.C. players
Hapoel Afula F.C. players
Hapoel Ramat Gan F.C. players
Liga Leumit players
Israeli Premier League players
Footballers from Kfar Saba
Association football midfielders